Stephany Smith (born August 10, 1965) was the head women's basketball coach at the University of Alabama from 2005 to 2008 and at Middle Tennessee State University from 1997 to 2005.

On March 12, 1997, Lewis Bivens announced his retirement as head coach of the Middle Tennessee State women's basketball team. At the time of his announcement, Smith was promoted to head coach for the 1997–1998 season. During her tenure with the Blue Raiders, Smith led Middle Tennessee to three NCAA Tournament appearances, two Ohio Valley Conference championships and back-to-back Sun Belt Conference championships. She compiled an overall record of 153 wins and 88 losses (153–88) with the Blue Raiders.

In April 2005, Smith was hired to replace Rick Moody as head basketball coach at Alabama, and became only the school's 7th head coach in school history. Smith was 29–90 with four Southeastern Conference wins in three seasons at Alabama. The team ended the 2007–2008 season with a 14-game losing streak, and as a result Smith was removed from her position on March 11, 2008, by athletics director Mal Moore.

Head coaching record

References

Living people
1965 births
Alabama Crimson Tide women's basketball coaches
American women's basketball coaches
Basketball coaches from Mississippi
Harding University alumni
Middle Tennessee Blue Raiders women's basketball coaches
People from Brookhaven, Mississippi
UAB Blazers women's basketball coaches